Antonio Bucciarelli (born 13 August 1970) is a retired Italian professional footballer who played as a midfielder. He played along with Maradona in the Napoli team that won the Serie A title in 1990.

Honours
Napoli
 UEFA Cup winner: 1988–89 (did not play any games but was on the roster).
 Serie A champion: 1989–90.

1970 births
Living people
Italian footballers
Serie A players
S.S.C. Napoli players
A.S.D. Giarre Calcio 1946 players
S.S. Juve Stabia players
F.C. Vittoria players
A.S.G. Nocerina players
Association football midfielders
S.F. Aversa Normanna players
F.C. Sangiuseppese players